Chennai Fort (formerly known as Madras Fort) (station code: MSF) is a station on the Chennai Suburban Railway and Chennai MRTS. It is the second station on the Chennai MRTS line from Chennai Beach to Velachery.

History
The station is named after Fort St. George, which it serves. Madras Dental College is located opposite the station, adjoining Madras Medical College Men's Hotel and Nursing College. The Madras Medical College is a few hundred metres away. The station consists of 260 sq m of open parking area.

The station

Platforms
There are a total of 5 platforms and 5 tracks. The platforms are connected by foot overbridge. These platforms are built to accumulate 24 coaches express train. The platforms are equipped with modern facility like display board of arrival and departure of trains.

Station layout

Gallery

See also
 Chennai Metro
 Chennai Suburban Railway
 Railway stations in Chennai

References

External links

 Indian Railways site
 Indian railway fan club

Chennai Mass Rapid Transit System stations
Stations of Chennai Suburban Railway
Railway stations in Chennai
Railway stations opened in 1931